Adelino Carlos Morais Nunes (born 6 September 1960) is a retired Portuguese footballer who played as a defensive midfielder.

Club career
Nunes was born in Manteigas, Guarda District. During 18 seasons as a professional, he played mainly for Vitória de Setúbal (seven seasons in two separate spells). In the 1984 summer, after the first stint at the Sado River side, he signed for top division giants S.L. Benfica, being a relatively important member of the teams that won the 1987 national championship – with the player contributing with 24 games and a career-best eight goals, including a brace in a 2–0 away win against S.C. Farense on 1 February 1987 – and three consecutive domestic cups.

In 1990, after two years with C.S. Marítimo, 30-year-old Nunes returned to Setúbal, suffering relegation in his first year but helping Vitória return to the top flight in his third, already as a fringe player however. He closed out his career at nearly 37 after two years with C.D. Beja (second level), where he reunited with former Setúbal teammate Hernâni Neves; over the course of 11 seasons, he amassed top division totals of 228 matches and 19 goals.

International career
Nunes gained 18 caps for Portugal, scoring twice. Most of his appearances came following the 1986 FIFA World Cup, as most of the internationals defected the national team after the infamous Saltillo Affair in Mexico.

|}

Honours
Benfica
Portuguese League: 1986–87
Portuguese Cup: 1984–85, 1985–86, 1986–87
Portuguese Supercup: 1985
European Cup: Runner-up 1987–88

External links

1960 births
Living people
Portuguese footballers
Association football midfielders
Primeira Liga players
Liga Portugal 2 players
Segunda Divisão players
F.C. Barreirense players
Vitória F.C. players
S.L. Benfica footballers
C.S. Marítimo players
C.D. Beja players
Portugal under-21 international footballers
Portugal international footballers
Sportspeople from Guarda District